Strömstad Municipality (Strömstads kommun) is a municipality in Västra Götaland County in western Sweden. Its seat is located in the city of Strömstad.

The municipality got its present boundaries in 1967, when  the City of Strömstad was merged with the two adjacent rural municipalities Tjärnö and Vette. Vette had been created in 1952 out of four older entities.

Geography
Strömstad Municipality is located on the Norwegian border and is known to attract large numbers of shoppers from Norway due to the marked price gap, notably in the tax-burdened alcohol and tobacco, but also groceries such as meat and sugar. There are also many deals on automotive services.

Localities
Kebal
Stare
Skee
Strömstad (seat)

References

External links

Strömstad Municipality - Official site
 Strömstad and Koster - Tourist site
 Besökskartan - Map

Municipalities of Västra Götaland County
Gothenburg and Bohus